In 2012, the  participated in the Currie Cup First Division and the Vodacom Cup. As part of the Southern Kings franchise, a number of players also participated in friendlies for this franchise.

Chronological list of events
4 January 2012: Castres Olympique announce that they have signed winger Paul Perez as a medical joker on a six-month deal.
19 January 2012: Former captain and Springbok De Wet Barry announces his retirement from playing, but will stay on at the Kings as a defensive coach.
25 January 2012: Earl Rose joins the Kings on a trial basis. Zane Killian also joins the Kings on a short-term loan deal.
31 January 2012: Scrum-half Dustin Jinka also joins the Kings on a trial basis.
6 February 2012: Paul Perez is denied a visa for his move to Castres Olympique.
21 February 2012: The Kings did not pursue their interest in any of the three trialists – Earl Rose, Zane Killian and Dustin Jinka – and they all leave the union.
6 March 2012: Two more players joined the Kings for a trial – former  prop Kevin Buys and Brian Skosana, who has been playing rugby league in Australia with the Sydney Roosters.
29 March 2012: Prop Wayne Swart joins the Kings until the end of the season.
12 April 2012: It is announced that Matt Sexton will join the Kings as head coach on 15 July, with Brad Mooar joining as a specialist skills coach.
17 April 2012: Prop Dexter Fahey is drafted into the Kings squad from university team  for their Vodacom Cup clash against .
15 May 2012: Fly-half Monty Dumond is released by the Kings.
29 May 2012: The Kings sign scrum-half Scott Mathie from the Sale Sharks.
Winger Paul Perez makes his debut for Samoa in the 2012 IRB Pacific Nations Cup.
6 June 2012: Winger Michael Killian also announces that he is returning to the Kings for the 2012 Currie Cup First Division season.
16 June 2012: Prop Schalk Ferreira joins the Kings for 2 months on a trial basis.
26 June 2012: The squad for the 2012 Currie Cup First Division is released.  Flanker Wimpie van der Walt is another new inclusion in the squad.
18 July 2012: Loose-forward Thabo Mamojele is included in a 25-man squad for the game against .
16 August 2012: Following the confirmation of the Southern Kings' participation in Super Rugby in 2013, the signing of fly-half Demetri Catrakilis for 2013 is confirmed.
5 September 2012: Lock Johan Snyman signs a contract with Welsh team Scarlets for the 2012–13 season.
7 September 2012:  players Samora Fihlani and Ntabeni Dukisa (both on loan at the ) sign contracts to join the Kings for the 2013 season.
12 September 2012: Lock Steven Sykes signed with the Kings for the 2013 Super Rugby season.
13 September 2012:  centre Andries Strauss also signed a two-year contract with the Kings for 2013.
3 October 2012: The Kings announce an additional three signings for 2013 :  hooker Bandise Maku,  back Hadleigh Parkes and Toulouse and  scrum-half Nicolás Vergallo.
13 October 2012: The Kings are crowned 2012 Currie Cup First Division champions, beating the  26 – 25 in the final.
27 October 2012: Tiger Mangweni wins the EP Kings Player of the Year award at the Kings awards banquet in Port Elizabeth, as well as the Most Valuable Player award. The Rookie of the Year award went to Cornell du Preez, the Under-21 Player of the Year award to Shane Gates and the Most Promising Player award went to Rynier Bernardo.
Clint Newland and André Schlechter also leave the Kings.
30 October 2012: The on-loan signing of  scrum-half Shaun Venter is also confirmed as he joined up with the team in Port Elizabeth, while Eusebio Guiñazú also joined the Kings.
5 November 2012: The Kings sign even more players, with front-rowers Ross Geldenhuys and Edgar Marutlulle (on loan the ) signing up.
13 November 2012: Former  winger Jongi Nokwe is named in a Cheetahs extended playing squad in preparation for the 2013 Super Rugby season.
24 November 2012: A 51-man Southern Kings 2013 Super Rugby wider training squad is announced. Centre Ronnie Cooke is another new name included in the team. However, Eusebio Guiñazú is not included as he joined English team Bath instead.
26 November 2012: Hooker Bobby Dyer joins club team Despatch.
27 November 2012: Despite not being named in the initial training group, director of rugby Alan Solomons confirms that Kenyan loose-forward Daniel Adongo will also join up with the team.
11 December 2012: Anele Pamba resigns as Kings CEO and is replaced by Charl Crous on an interim basis.
17 December 2012: The Kings sign French hooker Virgile Lacombe.

Players

Player Movements

Before the 2012 Vodacom Cup season

Before the 2012 Currie Cup season

After the 2012 Currie Cup season

Movement matrix
This is a list of transfers involving Eastern Province Kings players between the end of the 2011 Currie Cup First Division and the end of the 2012 Currie Cup First Division.

Players listed are all players that were included in a 22-man matchday squad at any during the season.

(did not play) denotes that a player did not play at all during one of the two seasons due to injury or non-selection. These players are included to indicate they remained attached to the team.

Players might be used in different positions, but will be listed in their most common positions during the two seasons.

Vodacom Cup

Log

Fixtures and results

Player statistics
The following table shows players statistics for the 2012 Vodacom Cup season:

 Jaco Bekker, Thembelani Bholi, Monty Dumond, Siyanda Grey, Sphephelo Mayaba, Thabiso Mngomezulu, Barend Pieterse, Mzwandile Stick, Louis Strydom and Luke Watson were named in the 2012 Vodacom Cup squad, but never included in a matchday 22.

Currie Cup

Log

Fixtures and results

Player statistics
The following table shows players statistics for the 2012 Currie Cup First Division season (including promotion/relegation games):

 Boela Abrahams, Thembelani Bholi, Kevin Buys, Barend Pieterse, Johan Snyman, Mzwandile Stick, Louis Strydom, Wayne Swart, Matthew Tayler-Smith, Justin van Staden and Andile Witbooi were named in the 2012 Currie Cup First Division squad, but never included in a matchday 22.

Other

In addition to the Currie Cup and Vodacom Cup, the Eastern Province Kings also played one first class match against a South African Students side:

The following players appeared in the match:

Under-21 Provincial Championship

Log

Fixtures and results

Players
The following players played during the 2012 Under-21 Provincial Championship Division B season:

Under-19 Provincial Championship

Log

Fixtures and results

Players
The following players played during the 2012 Under-19 Provincial Championship Division B season:

Southern Kings

Fixtures and results
The Southern Kings played in several pre-season friendlies against other Super Rugby franchises.

Awards

SARU Awards
The Kings received the following nominations for the SARU awards:

EP Kings Awards
The following awards were given to players for the 2012 season:

See also
Eastern Province Elephants
Southern Kings
2012 Vodacom Cup
2012 Currie Cup First Division
2012 Under-21 Provincial Championship
2012 Under-19 Provincial Championship

References

2012
2012 Currie Cup
2012 in South African rugby union